Elizabeth (Betty) Ryan (formerly Tylko) is an American game developer and programmer. She worked for General Computer Corporation (GCC) in the 1980s and was the 9th employee and first woman video game programmer at GCC. She programmed the 1982 Atari, Inc. arcade game Quantum as well as working on games for the Atari 2600, Atari 5200, and Atari 7800.

Education 

Ryan received a Bachelor of Arts in Engineering and Applied Sciences from Harvard University and she was a member of the Class of 1980.

Career 
Ryan programmed the Atari arcade video game Quantum, which was developed by the General Computer Corporation (GCC) for Atari, Inc. She was the 9th employee and first woman game developer at the company. Her sister, Carol Ryan Thomas, was hired later as a game tester and debugger.

After Quantum, Ryan worked on games for the Atari 2600, Atari 5200, and Atari 7800, including Pole Position, Dig Dug,GCC's unreleased version of Millipede for the Atari 7800. She also worked on the AtariLab educational software.

Ryan has spoken about her work in game development for the American Classic Arcade Museum. Since 2003, she has been working in web development with her son, John Tylko.

Games 

Quantum (arcade, 1982)
Pole Position (Atari 2600, 1982) port from arcade
Dig Dug (1983) port from arcade
AtariLab (1983)

Unreleased
Millipede (Atari 7800, 1983) port from arcade

References

External links 
 Betty Ryan Tylko at Atari Women

American video game programmers
Women video game programmers
Living people
Harvard School of Engineering and Applied Sciences alumni
Year of birth missing (living people)